44th meridian may refer to:

44th meridian east, a line of longitude east of the Greenwich Meridian
44th meridian west, a line of longitude west of the Greenwich Meridian